Georgios Diamantidis (born 3 January 1984) is a Greek former swimmer, who specialized in long-distance freestyle events. Diamantidis qualified for the men's 1500 m freestyle at the 2004 Summer Olympics in Athens, by clearing a FINA A-standard entry time of 15:09.25 from the Greece National Open in Thessaloniki. He challenged seven other swimmers on the fourth heat, including top medal favorite Larsen Jensen of the United States. He rounded out the field to last place by a 27-second margin behind Italy's Christian Minotti in 16:06.31. Diamantidis failed to advance into the final, as he placed thirty-first overall in the preliminaries.

Career
 Olympic Games
 2004 Greece, Athens 1500m freestyle
 World Championship
 2003 Barcelona 1500m freestyle
 World Cups
 2001 Imperia, Italy 400m-1500m freestyle
 2002 Paris,France 400m-1500m freestyle
 2003 Spain, Barcelona 400m-1500m freestyle
 European Championships
 2002 Austria, Linz 400m-1500m (A) freestyle
 2004 Spain, Madrid 1500m (M) freestyle
 2006 Hungary, Budapest 1500m (M) freestyle

References

External links
2004 Olympic Profile – Eideisis Ellinika 

1984 births
Living people
Sportspeople from Katerini
Greek male swimmers
Olympic swimmers of Greece
Swimmers at the 2004 Summer Olympics
Greek male freestyle swimmers